Copelatus tenebrosus is a species of diving beetle. It is part of the genus Copelatus in the subfamily Copelatinae of the family Dytiscidae. It was described by Régimbart in 1880.

References

tenebrosus
Beetles described in 1880